Elbridge is the name of:

 Elbridge Ayer Burbank (1858–1949), American artist
 Elbridge Boyden (1810–1898), American architect
 Elbridge Chapman (1895–1954), American military officer
 Elbridge Durbrow (1903–1997), American diplomat
 Elbridge Gerry (disambiguation)
 Elbridge Hanecy (1852–1925), American lawyer and politician
 Elbridge G. Lapham (1814–1890), American politician
 Elbridge Robinson (1844–1918), American military officer
 Elbridge Ross (1909–1980), American ice hockey player
 Elbridge G. Spaulding (1809–1897), American politician
 Elbridge Streeter Brooks (1846–1902), American author, editor, and critic
 Elbridge Trask (1815–1863), American fur trapper
 Elbridge Van Syckel Besson (1839–1915), American politician